Hiroyuki Fujita (born 16 June 1969) is a Japanese professional golfer.

Career
Fujita has won 18 tournaments on the Japan Golf Tour and has featured in the top 50 of the Official World Golf Ranking, finishing in 48th position of the 2010 year-end Official World Golf Ranking. In 2012, Fujita won four tournaments on the Japan Golf Tour en route to winning the Order of Merit.

Professional wins (20)

Japan Golf Tour wins (18)

*Note: Tournament shortened to 54 holes due to weather.
1Co-sanctioned by the Asian Tour

Japan Golf Tour playoff record (5–3)

Japan Challenge Tour wins (2)
1997 Mito Green Open, Twin Fields Cup

Results in major championships

CUT = missed the half-way cut
"T" indicates a tie for a place

Results in World Golf Championships
Results not in chronological order before 2015.

QF, R16, R32, R64 = Round in which player lost in match play
"T" = Tied

Team appearances
World Cup (representing Japan): 1997, 2009
Alfred Dunhill Cup (representing Japan): 1998
Dynasty Cup (representing Japan): 2003, 2005
Royal Trophy (representing Asia): 2013

See also
List of golfers with most Japan Golf Tour wins

References

External links

Japanese male golfers
Japan Golf Tour golfers
Sportspeople from Fukuoka Prefecture
1969 births
Living people
20th-century Japanese people